William Howard "Bud" Kerr (November 10, 1915 – April 9, 1964) was an American football player and coach. He was an All-American football player at Notre Dame in 1939. He later served as the head football coach at the University of Dayton, from 1956 to 1959.

Kerr was born in Tarrytown, New York but moved to Newburgh at three years old. He attended Newburgh Free Academy where he was in the school bad for his first three years and only joined the football team as a part-time player as a senior. After high school, he worked for four years in order to afford college.

Kerr attended the University of Notre Dame where he played college football at the end position for the Notre Dame Fighting Irish football team.  He was selected by the Associated Press, the All-America Board, the Newspaper Enterprise Association, the Sporting News and the Walter Camp Football Foundation as a first-team end on the 1939 College Football All-America Team.

After graduating from Notre Dame, Kerr held assistant coaching positions at Washington University in St. Louis and, during World War II, at the U.S. Navy Pre-Flight School at Athens, Georgia.  Kerr served as a line coach at the University of Denver in 1947 and 1948 and then moved to the University of San Francisco to take on the same role there in 1949.  He was hired as the head football coach at the University of San Francisco, succeeding fellow Notre Dame alumnus, Joe Kuharich, in December 1951.  However, the San Francisco Dons football program was discontinued in early 1952 and did not resume until several years later.  In February 1956, after a stint as the ends coach of the University of Washington Huskies, Kerr was hired as the head football coach for the University of Dayton Flyers football team. He coached the Flyers from 1956 to 1959, compiling a record of 15–24–1.

Kerr later worked as a motel manager and an employee of Pioneer Carloading Co. in San Francisco.  He died in San Francisco in 1964 at age 47.

Head coaching record

References

External links
 
 

1915 births
1964 deaths
American football ends
Dayton Flyers football coaches
Denver Pioneers football coaches
Georgia Pre-Flight Skycrackers football coaches
Los Angeles Dons players
Notre Dame Fighting Irish football players
San Francisco Dons football coaches
Washington Huskies football coaches
Washington University Bears football coaches
Sportspeople from Newburgh, New York
People from Tarrytown, New York
Players of American football from New York (state)
United States Navy personnel of World War II
American people of English descent
American people of French-Canadian descent
Burials at Golden Gate National Cemetery
Newburgh Free Academy alumni